Qasımlı (also, Kasymly and Kasumly) is a village and municipality in the Masally Rayon of Azerbaijan.  It has a population of 2,079.

References 

Populated places in Masally District